The LSU Strength and Conditioning facility or LSU North Stadium weight room, is a strength training and conditioning facility at Louisiana State University. Built in 1997, it is located adjacent to Tiger Stadium. Measuring  with a flat surface, it has 28 multi-purpose power stations, 36 assorted selectorized machines and 10 dumbbell stations along with a plyometric specific area, medicine balls, hurdles, plyometric boxes and assorted speed and agility equipment. It also features 2 treadmills, 4 stationary bikes, 2 elliptical cross trainers, a stepper and stepmill.

The facility was originally constructed to house all of LSU's sports teams, but is now home to the men's and women's basketball, gymnastics, softball, men's and women's swimming and diving, men's and women's tennis teams.

Gallery

See also
LSU Tigers men's basketball
LSU Tigers women's basketball
LSU Lady Tigers gymnastics
LSU Lady Tigers softball
LSU Tigers swimming and diving
LSU Lady Tigers swimming and diving
LSU Tigers and Lady Tigers
LSU Football Operations Center
Bernie Moore Track Stadium

References

External links
LSU Strength and Conditioning Facility

LSU Tigers basketball venues
LSU Lady Tigers basketball venues
LSU Tigers women's gymnastics venues
LSU Tigers softball venues
LSU Tigers and Lady Tigers swimming and diving venues
LSU Tigers tennis venues
LSU Lady Tigers tennis venues
LSU Tigers women's volleyball venues
1997 establishments in Louisiana